Stratum, also known as the "Stratum Project", is a series of 23 sculptures by landscape architect Mikyoung Kim, installed near Portland, Oregon's Sellwood Bridge, in the United States.

Description
Stratum is a public art installation consisting of 23 multicolored sculptures, or "ecologically inspired geological totems", along the east approach to the Sellwood Bridge in southeast Portland's Sellwood neighborhood. They "rotate" at 90-degree angles. According to the Regional Arts & Culture Council, the project's concept was "driven by the power and beauty of the geologic and natural phenomena" of the Willamette Valley. It was funded by the City of Portland's art program. The sculptures are owned by the city and maintained by the Regional Arts & Culture Council.

History
Mikyoung Kim's work was selected by the Regional Arts & Culture Council in 2012. The totems were created by Art & Design Works of Cornelius.

Workers began installing the totems in August 2016, starting on the south side of Southeast Tacoma Street. The remaining sculptures are slated to be installed on the north side of Tacoma Street by the end of 2016.

See also

 2016 in art

References

External links
 Sellwood Bridge Gateway: Stratum Project at Mikyoung Kim Design

2016 establishments in Oregon
2016 sculptures
Outdoor sculptures in Portland, Oregon
Sculpture series
Sellwood-Moreland, Portland, Oregon
Totem poles in the United States